Fiodor of Kiev (active in the 14th century), was a prince of Kiev (Kyiv). Most likely he was the son of Butvydas, and a younger brother of Gediminas, Grand Duke of Lithuania. Only a couple of short notes survive regarding Fiodor's life.

In early 1320s Gediminas won the Battle on the Irpen' River against Stanislav of Kiev and captured the city. The Tatars, who also claimed Kiev, retaliated in 1324–1325. The Lithuanian Chronicles mention that Gediminas installed his deputy Algimantas, son of Mindaugas from Olshanski family. There were some attempts to claim that Algimantas was Fiodor's pagan name, but they are discharged by evidence that Algimantas was baptized as Mikhail.

In 1331 Vasily Kalika, a newly consecrated Archbishop of Novgorod, was traveling from Volodymyr-Volynskyi to Veliky Novgorod. On his way he was stopped by Fiodor, Duke of Kiev, a Tatar tax collector (basqaq), and fifty men. The presence of a Tatar official led historians to believe that while Kiev was ruled by a Lithuanian, it had to pay a tribute to the Golden Horde. Lithuanians gained full control of the city after the victorious Battle of Blue Waters in 1362. According to the Gustynskaya Chronicle, after the battle Fiodor was replaced as Duke of Kiev by Vladimir, son of Algirdas.

For a long time scholars assumed that Fiodor was of Rurikid origin (descendant of Oleg I of Chernigov) because of his Christian name. However, in 1916 Russian historian Mikhail Priselkov published a list of property belonging to Theognostus, Metropolitan of Moscow. The list, compiled in 1331, listed two silver cups given to Theognostus by Fiodor, brother of Gediminas. Modern historians agree that Fiodor from the list and Fiodor from Kiev was one and the same person. No other evidence survives regarding Fiodor's family.

See also
 Family of Gediminas

References

External links
 Voitovych, L. Princely dynasties of the Eastern Europe (end of 9th - start of 16th centuries). Lviv 2000.

Gediminids
History of Kyiv

14th-century Lithuanian people
14th-century Russian people